Psittaculirostris is a genus of parrots in the family Psittaculidae found in Indonesia and Papua New Guinea.

Species
It contains three species:

References

 
Psittacidae
Bird genera
Taxonomy articles created by Polbot